The Bob Corwin Quartet featuring the Trumpet of Don Elliott is an album by American jazz pianist Bob Corwin featuring trumpeter Don Elliott which was recorded in 1956 for the Riverside label.

Track listing
 "My Shining Hour" (Harold Arlen, Johnny Mercer)   
 "Isn't It Romantic?" (Lorenz Hart, Richard Rodgers)
 "I'll Remember April" (Gene de Paul,  Patricia Johnston, Don Raye)  
 "I Remember You" (Johnny Mercer, Victor Schertzinger)
 "Rico-Jico Joe" (Don Elliott)  
 "It Might as Well Be Spring" (Oscar Hammerstein II, Richard Rodgers)   
 "I'll Take Romance" (Hammerstein, Ben Oakland)  
 "Gone with the Wind" (Herb Magidson, Allie Wrubel)   
 "It Could Happen to You" (Johnny Burke, Jimmy Van Heusen)  
 "Ponytail" (Bob Corwin)

Personnel 
Bob Corwin - piano
Don Elliott - trumpet
Ernie Furtado - bass
Jimmy Campbell - drums

References 

1956 albums
Don Elliott albums
Albums produced by Orrin Keepnews
Riverside Records albums